Montclair is a census-designated place (CDP) in Prince William County, Virginia, United States. The population was 22,279 in the 2020 census. An affluent residential community surrounding a man-made lake and golf course, development began in the late 1960s and new home construction ended during the 1990s.

Geography
According to the United States Census Bureau, the CDP has a total area of 6.2 square miles (16.0 km2), of which, 6.0 square miles (15.6 km2) of it is land and 0.1 square miles (0.3 km2) of it (2.11%) is water.

Lake Montclair
 
Lake Montclair is popular for boating, and fishing.  There are three private beaches located off the lake: Dolphin Beach, West Beach, and Beaver Landing, with Dolphin Beach being the largest and offering amenities such as a pavilion with picnic tables, volleyball court, playground, and restroom.  Several events are held at Dolphin Beach throughout the year with food, live music, and other family-friendly activities.  An Independence Day event followed by a fireworks display is held each year as well.

Demographics
As of the census of 2000, there were 15,728 people, 5,084 households, and 4,326 families residing in the CDP. The racial makeup of the CDP was 77.63% White, 14.71% African American, 0.41% Native American, 3.02% Asian, 0.20% Pacific Islander, 1.08% from other races, and 2.94% from two or more races. Hispanic or Latino of any race were 4.51% of the population.

There were 5,084 households, out of which 51.0% had children under the age of 18 living with them, 72.8% were married couples living together, 9.6% had a female householder with no husband present, and 14.9% were non-families. 11.0% of all households were made up of individuals, and 1.4% had someone living alone who was 65 years of age or older. The average household size was 3.09 and the average family size was 3.35.

In the CDP, the population was spread out, with 32.4% under the age of 18, 6.9% from 18 to 24, 32.2% from 25 to 44, 25.2% from 45 to 64, and 3.4% who were 65 years of age or older. The median age was 34 years. For every 100 females, there were 96.9 males. For every 100 females age 18 and over, there were 92.7 males.

The median income for a household in the CDP was $88,496, and the median income for a family was $92,028. Males had a median income of $60,410 versus $39,255 for females. The per capita income for the CDP was $30,711. About 2.3% of families and 2.6% of the population were below the poverty line, including 3.0% of those under age 18 and 6.7% of those age 65 or over.

Most citizens who live in Montclair are currently represented in Virginia's House of Delegates by Democrat Elizabeth Guzmán. Redistricting split the community into two districts and a small portion of Montclair is represented by Luke Torian.

Government
Every year the Home Owners Association, known as MPOA (Montclair Property Owners Association), holds elections and confirms the newly elected Board at its annual meeting. MPOA governs the community making sure covenance is met, the lake is properly maintained, and the needs of the community are looked after.

References

External links

 Prince William County Government

Census-designated places in Prince William County, Virginia
Census-designated places in Virginia
Washington metropolitan area